Live in Japan is a concert by the band Earth, Wind & Fire released on DVD in 2008 by Eagle Rock Entertainment.

Overview 
Earth, Wind & Fire: Live in Japan was originally issued in 1998 on VHS by Pioneer Entertainment. The concert was recorded in the Tokyo Dome during the band's "Heritage Tour".

Critical reception
The Urban Music Scene noted "it doesn't get any better than this folks" with Live in Japan. 
Mark Deming of Allmovie noted that EWF "show they still have talent and charisma to spare in this concert filmed in Japan in 1990".
Matt Bauer of Exclaim! also called Live in Japan "mesmerizing".

Track listing

Personnel
Earth, Wind & Fire
Maurice White - kalimba, percussion, vocals
Phillip Bailey - vocals, percussion
Sheldon Reynolds - vocals, guitar
Ralph Johnson - percussion, vocals
Dick Smith - guitar, vocals
Vance Taylor - keyboard
Verdine White - bass
Andrew Woolfolk - saxophone
Sonny Emory - drums
Earth, Wind & Fire Horns
Reggie Young - trombone
Ray Brown - trumpet
Gary Bias - saxophone

References

1998 video albums
1998 live albums
Earth, Wind & Fire video albums
Earth, Wind & Fire live albums
Live video albums